Mario Severino Feleppa  is a former Australian politician. He was a Labor member of the South Australian Legislative Council from 1982 to his resignation in 1995.

He was awarded the Medal of the Order of Australia in June 1980.

References

Year of birth missing (living people)
Living people
Members of the South Australian Legislative Council
Recipients of the Medal of the Order of Australia
Place of birth missing (living people)
Australian Labor Party members of the Parliament of South Australia